Reggae Hit L.A. is the third full-length studio album from Los Angeles reggae band The Aggrolites.  It is also their second album for Hellcat Records, following their May 2006 self-titled release.  The album was released 2 weeks after Tim Armstrong's debut album, A Poet's Life, on which The Aggrolites served as the backing band.

A video for "Free Time" was released in early July 2007.

The album won an IGN award for Best Reggae Album of 2007.

Track listing 
All songs written, recorded, mixed, and produced by The Aggrolites.
 "Work It" - 4:14
 "Faster Bullet" - 3:12
 "You Got 5" - 2:53
 "Reconcile" - 4:33
 "Reggae Hit L.A." - 3:06
 "Let's Pack Our Bags" - 4:10
 "Left Red" - 3:05
 "Free Time" - 3:01
 "Lucky Streak" - 3:06
 "Rhythm & Light" - 4:03
 "Well Runs Dry (a.k.a. Free Soul)" - 3:31
 "Hip to It" - 2:58
 "Fire Girl" - 3:20
 "Baldhead Rooster" - 3:11
 "We Came to Score" - 3:50
 "Hidden Track" - 18:35
The hidden track is composed primarily of repeating drum beats.
There is also another hidden track on this album. If one rewinds the CD from the beginning of "Work It", there is a honky-tonk style instrumental song.

Credits
 Jesse Wagner - Vocals, Lead Guitar
 Roger Rivas - Organ, Piano
 Brian Dixon - Rhythm Guitar
 J Bonner - Bass
 Korey "Kingston" Horn - Drums

Additional Musicians
 Tom Cook - Trombone
 Boogie Jones - Saxophone
 Eitan Avineri - Trumpet
 MC Junor Francis - DJ on "You Got 5"
 Background chants by Nicki Mansuetti, Christina Wagner, and Gabe Aguirre

Other Credits
 Mastered by Gene Grimaldi at Oasis in Burbank, CA
 Richard P. Robinson - Assistant Engineer
 Artwork by The Aggrolites
 Front cover photo by Robert Cortez
 Back cover photo by Chris Gomez
 Collage by J Bonner and Nicki Mansuetti

References

External links
 

The Aggrolites albums
2007 albums
Albums recorded at Kingsize Soundlabs